Lions cricket team may refer to:

England Lions cricket team, England's "A" team
Highveld Lions cricket team, South African domestic team
Lahore Lions, Pakistani Twenty20 team